This page presents the results of the men's and women's volleyball tournament during the 1967 Pan American Games, which was held from July 24 to August 3, 1967 in Winnipeg, Manitoba, Canada.

Men's indoor tournament

Preliminary round

Final ranking

Women's indoor tournament

Preliminary round robin

Final ranking

References
 Men's results
 Women's results

1967
1967 Pan American Games
Pan American Games